Jahan Rejepowna Pollyýewa (born April 15, 1960, in Ashkhabad, Turkmenistan) is the Chief of Staff of the State Duma of Russia. Song's author. A member of the Writers' Union of Russia.

Biography 

Education: Moscow State University, 1982; State and Law Institute of the Academy of Sciences of the USSR, 1986. Ph.D. in law.

1986–1990: Junior researcher, senior researcher, head of political law department of the Research Center at the Youth Institute of the Central Committee of the Young Communist League and the USSR State Committee of Labor.

1990–1991: Chief analyst, adviser to Moscow City Council of People's Deputies.

1991–1992: Head of Social and Political Analysis and Forecasting Division, member of the Councillor of State Service's Administrative Board on political issues.

1992–1993: Adviser to the Presidential Executive Office of the Russian Federation.

1993–1995: Adviser to Deputy Prime Minister.

1995–1997: Executive Secretary, Vice President of the Interfax News Agency.

1997: Adviser to First Deputy Prime Minister and Minister of Fuel and Energy.

1997: Aide to the Head of the Presidential Executive Office.

1997–1998: Senior Assistant of the President of the Russian Federation.

1998: Head of the Secretariat of Prime Minister.

1998-2012: Deputy Head of the Presidential Executive Office.

March 2004 – 2012: Aide to the President of the Russian Federation.

Since January 2012: Chief of Staff of the State Duma of the Russian Federation.

References

Licence

External links
 Джахан Реджеповна Поллыева . Досье: бизнес-интересы, родственники и деловые связи

1960 births
Living people
1st class Active State Councillors of the Russian Federation
Russian people of Turkmenistan descent
Aides to the President of Russia
People from Ashgabat
Moscow State University alumni
Recipients of the Order "For Merit to the Fatherland", 3rd class
Recipients of the Order of Honour (Russia)
Recipients of the Lenin Komsomol Prize
Russian songwriters